The La Casita Formation is a geologic formation in Mexico. It preserves fossils dating back to the Kimmeridgian to lowermost Berriasian. It is laterally equivalent to the La Caja Formation and the Pimienta Formation. The ichthyosaurs Jabalisaurus and Acuetzpalin are known from the formation, as well as the metriorhynchid Dakosaurus and indeterminate pliosaurs.

See also

 List of fossiliferous stratigraphic units in Mexico

References

External links

Jurassic Mexico
Kimmeridgian Stage
Tithonian Stage
Jurassic System of North America